Scapino is a 1974 play adapted by Jim Dale and Frank Dunlop from Les Fourberies de Scapin by Molière opened at the Brooklyn Academy of Music in  New York. A production by the Young Vic, it starred Jim Dale, Denise Coffey and Ian Trigger and was directed by Frank Dunlop. The production later moved to the Ambassador Theatre in New York.

In this adaptation Molière's French play is transposed to modern Naples in a British pantomime-style. Here the deceitful valet Scapino contrives to bring his master's children of two sons and two daughters and their various loves together through all kinds of trickery - despite his master's own plans for them.  The music was by Jim Dale.

In 1974 Frank Dunlop was nominated for the Drama Desk Award for Outstanding Director; Dale won the Outer Critics Circle Award and the Drama Desk Award in 1974, while in 1975 Dale was nominated for Best Actor and Dunlop for Best Director at the 29th Tony Awards.

Cast
(The first names appeared in the original production at the Brooklyn Academy of Music in  New York. The second set are the cast after the show moved to the Ambassador Theatre in New York.

Scapino (servant of Geronte) - Jim Dale 
Headwaiter - Barry Michlin
Waiters -Hugh Hastings and Alan Coates/George Connolly and Norman Abrams
Waitress - Jenny Austen/Holly Villaire
Argante - Ian Trigger
Giacinta - Mel Martin/Connie Fursland
Carlo - Andrew Robertson/John Horn
Ottavio (son of Argant) - Ian Charleson/Christopher Hastings
Sylvestro (servant of Argante, friend of Scapino) - Gavin Reed
Geronte - Paul Brooke/J. Frank Lucas
Leandro (son of Geronte) - Phil Killian
Zerbinetta (a gypsy, beloved of Leandro) - Denise Coffey/Hattie Winston
Nurse - Lotti Taylor/Bertha Sklar

References

1974 plays
Broadway plays
Off-Broadway plays
Plays based on works by Molière